Edward "Dutch" Sternaman (February 9, 1895 – February 1, 1973) was an American player and owner in professional football for the Chicago Bears of the National Football League (NFL).

During the 1910s, Sternaman and George Halas excelled on the Illinois Fighting Illini football team. In 1919, Sternaman was contacted by executives from the Arcola, Illinois (Independents) football team and asked to assemble a roster strong enough to exact revenge on A. E. Staley's team following a 41–0 loss. Although Sternaman agreed, the Staleys were not present when they became aware of the plan. Staley later approached Sternaman to increase the team's competitiveness, but he declined as he was close to finishing his mechanical engineering degree at Illinois.

In 1920, Halas assumed control of the Staleys, and Sternaman was the first player to sign with the team. During the 1920 season, Sternaman would rush for 11 touchdowns. He was also known for his kicking prowess, finishing his career with 21 field goals and 28 extra points when including 1920. When the team moved to Chicago in 1921, Halas "offered" 50 percent of the club to Sternaman. At season's end, the two competed with agent Bill Harley for ownership of the Staleys The other owners in the American Professional Football Association (now National Football League) decided in favor of the Halas/Sternaman partnership by an 8–2 vote. The Staleys were renamed the Bears in 1922. Joey Sternaman, Dutch's younger brother, also played for the team.

For the next decade, Halas was the face of the franchise, representing the Bears at league meetings. Although Sternaman was a full partner, he largely stayed in the background.

Reflecting how low the NFL ranked on the sports scene, the Bears had a difficult time making ends meet even with Red Grange on the roster. Both Halas and Sternaman had to work other jobs, especially in the offseason. The Great Depression only exacerbated the problem. At the same time, Sternaman had lost money after a series of investments went sour. With the rest of his money tied up in the Bears, Sternaman arranged for Halas to buy him out. The agreement had a deadline for Halas to make final payment or lose everything he had invested to Sternaman. According to Halas, he made the final payment with just minutes to spare.

According to the Staley Museum, however, Halas and Sternaman agreed to submit sealed bids for the other man's half of the team, with Halas submitting the winning bid of $38,000. Reportedly no one apart from Halas, Sternaman or the two partners' lawyers knew the value of Sternaman's bid.

In 1934, Sternamen purchased and fenced off a lakefront property at Lake Ivanhoe, WI, a predominantly Black community, intending to turn it into a white resort. He subsequently lost in a civil lawsuit by Black neighbors on grounds that the beach and parks around Lake Ivanhoe were a public good.

In 1948, he coached at North Park University in Chicago.

References

External links
“Dutch” Sternaman Bio (Staley Museum)
 
 

1895 births
1973 deaths
Chicago Bears owners
Chicago Bears coaches
Chicago Bears players
Chicago Staleys players
Decatur Staleys players
Illinois Fighting Illini football players
Sportspeople from Chicago
Players of American football from Chicago